Donaca Lake is a ,  deep lake in Linn County, Oregon, United States. The lake can be accessed via two different trails, one from the south and one from the north. The lake is located within an old growth forest in the Middle Santiam Wilderness near Sweet Home.

Donaca Lake provides habitat for a unique strain of cutthroat trout and affords excellent fishing for lively  specimens. Though not required by law, catch and release methods are encouraged to protect this fishery.

See also
 List of lakes in Oregon

References

Lakes of Oregon
Lakes of Linn County, Oregon
Protected areas of Linn County, Oregon
Willamette National Forest